Jelle Florizoone (born 22 September 1995) is a Belgian actor and dancer. He is best known for his roles as Pim in the film North Sea Texas (2011) and Rick in the children's series ROX (2011–2015).

Early life and education
Florizoone was born in the coastal town of Ostend. He became a fan of all things performing arts at a young age, and his mother enrolled him in local ballet classes. It was then suggested he audition for the Royal Ballet School of Antwerp, where he would attend as a boarding student. He went on to study Musical Theatre at the Royal Conservatory of Brussels, but withdrew two years into the course to make time for ROX.

Career
In 2011, Florizoone starred as the main character of Pim in the Flemish drama film North Sea Texas. The film follows the story of Pim, a boy living with his reckless mother, who falls in love with his male best friend, Gino. Later, he starred in the children's superhero drama ROX (2011–present), which revolves around three young heroes with exceptional talents and an exceptional car called ROX.

Florizoone has also appeared in the TV show Mega Mindy, and in the movies Allez, Eddy and Marina. In September 2015 he was first seen as Guido Van Den Bossche, a main role in VTM's soap opera Familie, being the fourth actor in a row performing this character. After some months he decided to quit the soap at end of season's finale in June 2016. He was succeeded by Vincent Banic.

Personal life
He is openly gay.  He has worked part-time as a flight attendant.

Filmography

Film

Television

Stage

References

External links
 

1995 births
21st-century Flemish male actors
Belgian male television actors
Belgian gay actors
Flight attendants
Living people
People from Ostend